In mathematics, a smooth structure on a manifold allows for an unambiguous notion of smooth function. In particular, a smooth structure allows one to perform mathematical analysis on the manifold.

Definition 

A smooth structure on a manifold  is a collection of smoothly equivalent smooth atlases.

A smooth manifold is a topological  manifold  together with a smooth structure on

Maximal smooth atlases 

By taking the union of all atlases belonging to a smooth structure, we obtain a maximal smooth atlas. This atlas contains every chart that is compatible with the smooth structure. There is a natural one-to-one correspondence between smooth structures and maximal smooth atlases.   
Thus, we may regard a smooth structure as a maximal smooth atlas and vice versa.

In general, computations with the maximal atlas of a manifold are rather unwieldy. For most applications, it suffices to choose a smaller atlas. 
For example, if the manifold is compact, then one can find an atlas with only finitely many charts.

Equivalence of smooth structures 

Exotic spheres 

John Milnor showed in 1956 that the 7-dimensional sphere admits a smooth structure that is not equivalent to the standard smooth structure. A sphere equipped with a nonstandard smooth structure is called an exotic sphere.

E8 manifold 

The E8 manifold is an example of a topological manifold that does not admit a smooth structure. This essentially demonstrates that Rokhlin's theorem holds only for smooth structures, and not topological manifolds in general.

Related structures 

The smoothness requirements on the transition functions can be weakened, so that we only require the transition maps to be -times continuously differentiable; or strengthened, so that we require the transition maps to be real-analytic. Similarly, we can define a complex structure by requiring the transition maps to be holomorphic.

See also

References 

 
 
 

Differential topology
Structures on manifolds